Kamil Radulj (born 9 October 1988) is a Polish professional footballer who plays as a midfielder for Karpaty Krosno.

References

1988 births
People from Krosno
Sportspeople from Podkarpackie Voivodeship
Living people
Polish footballers
Association football midfielders
Stal Mielec players
Korona Kielce players
Hetman Zamość players
Karpaty Krosno players
Siarka Tarnobrzeg players
Resovia (football) players
Stal Stalowa Wola players
I liga players
II liga players
III liga players